Sachindra Prasad Singh is a member of the Bharatiya Janata Party from Bihar. He has won the Bihar Legislative Assembly election in 2010 from Kesaria and 2015 from Kalyanpur.

References

Living people
People from East Champaran district
Bharatiya Janata Party politicians from Bihar
Bihar MLAs 2010–2015
Bihar MLAs 2015–2020
Year of birth missing (living people)
Bihar MLAs 2020–2025